Up Front is a World War II card-based wargame. It was designed by Courtney F. Allen and published by Avalon Hill in 1983.  Hasbro now owns the franchise, and at one time licensed it to Multi-Man Publishing, a license that has since expired without republication of the game. There was an attempt to reprint Up Front through Kickstarter in 2013. The project raised over $300,000, but no updates to status has been posted since March 21, 2014.

In 2016 Hasbro licensed Wargame Vault to sell Up Front as a print on demand product; and the game is now available through on-line ordering.  The official rules are currently available to order either as a printed book or as a portable document format electronic file. The components (cards) are produced on high quality card-stock with all known official errata incorporated in the reprints.

Description

Subtitled The Squad Leader Card Game, Up Front was intended as a card version of their successful Squad Leader series of games, but it represented a radical change in approach.  Traditional wargames are based on maps representing terrain and game pieces representing units, which attack on their players' turns.  Up Front has terrain, attack opportunities, and other factors determined by cards dealt to the players.

Fans of the game claim this type of play gives the player a more realistic feel for man-to-man combat where most terrain will be unfamiliar.  With traditional map-based wargames, players have an overhead view of the entire battlefield.  In Up Front, locations are revealed as the game is played, emulating how real soldiers might encounter and explore terrain.

The game contains two different kinds of cards, Personality and Action.  A Personality card depicts a single soldier and several statistics about him including his name, rank, and the weapon he is carrying.  These are assigned by the scenario selected (scenarios lettered A-L were included in the base game) and arranged in groups by the players. The Action Deck contains different types of cards including terrain, movement, heroes, and many other game factors. These are shuffled and dealt to the players.

The original game included German, U.S., and Russian units along with their equipment.  Expansions added to the nationalities available for play. Each nationality was given different capabilities including variations in hand size and discard ability which imposes different tactics for the players by limiting the options available to them.

Expansions 
Two official expansions were released for Up Front:
 Banzai (1984), which included Japanese, British, and USMC forces along with rules for Jungle Terrain, Random Reinforcements, and Scenarios M-X.
 Desert War (1985), which included French, and Italian forces as well as rules for Desert Terrain.

Both expansions are now available as print to order products from Wargame Vault.

Reception
Sandy Petersen comments: "If you can find a copy of Up Front, and you like tactical combat at all, check it out. Or even if you just like card games. In either case, you won't be disappointed. This is a game that surpasses its flaws, and turns some of them into strengths."

Legacy 
Like many Avalon Hill games, Up Front continues to be popular among loyal fans.  There are active groups dedicated to the game on the Internet.

There is also a VASSAL Engine module for this game.

Wargame Vault now sells licensed copies of the original game and both expansions as print to order products.

References

External links 
 
 Up Front Online Rulebook
 Halisp Up Front mailing list
 Up Front Yahoo! group
 Robo's Up Front Card Game Page
 Up Front! Official Rulebook from Wargame Vault

Avalon Hill games
Card games introduced in 1983
Dedicated deck card games
Man-to-man wargames
World War II games